Elizabeth Gasque Van Exem (February 26, 1886 – November 2, 1989), named Elizabeth Hawley Gasque during her tenure in Congress, was an American politician who served as the U.S. representative for South Carolina's 6th congressional district from September 13, 1938, to January 3, 1939. She was the first woman elected to Congress from South Carolina.

At the age of 103 years, 249 days, Gasque is the longest-lived member of Congress ever, a record that still stands as of 2023.

U.S. House of Representatives
Gasque was elected to the House of Representatives on September 13, 1938, to fill the vacancy caused by the death of her husband, Allard Henry Gasque. She never actually attended Congress, which was not in session during her months of office.

Gasque was not a candidate for renomination. After her tenure in Congress, she was an author and lecturer.

Personal life and death
The Social Security death records state that Gasque was born in 1893, under her later married name of Van Exem. However, census records support the 1886 birth year.

Gasque died aged 103 in Ridgeway, South Carolina where she lived.
She was the longest-lived member of Congress since Maurice Thatcher, who died in 1973.

In 1982, a section of South Carolina state road was named the Elizabeth Gasque Van Exem Highway.

See also
 Women in the United States House of Representatives

Sources

References

1886 births
1989 deaths
American centenarians
Female members of the United States House of Representatives
Women in South Carolina politics
Democratic Party members of the United States House of Representatives from South Carolina
20th-century American politicians
20th-century American women politicians
People from Blythewood, South Carolina
People from Ridgeway, South Carolina
Women centenarians